James McKee may refer to:

 James McKee (footballer), Scottish footballer of the 1890s and early 1900s
 James Y. McKee, (1836–1891), American interim president of Pennsylvania State University
 Jim McKee (1947–2002), American baseball pitcher

See also
 Jaimes McKee (born 1987), English-born Hong Kong footballer
 James McKie (disambiguation)
 James McKay (disambiguation)